Tarenna nilagirica is a species of plant in the family Rubiaceae. It is native to Karnataka and Kerala in India.

References

nilagirica
Flora of Karnataka
Flora of Kerala
Vulnerable plants
Taxonomy articles created by Polbot